Luigi Vannucchi (25 November 1930 – 30 August 1978) was an Italian film, stage and television actor.

Life and career 
Born in Caltanissetta, Vannucchi graduated at Silvio d'Amico National Academy of Dramatic Arts in 1952 and shortly after entered the theatrical company of Vittorio Gassman. In 1958 he entered the Giorgio Strehler's company. From early 60's he also was very active as television actor, often in negative roles, in successful TV-series as A come Andromeda and I promessi sposi. His film career was less prolific, but however it includes notable titles as Mikhail Kalatozov's The Red Tent, Joseph Losey's The Assassination of Trotsky and Roberto Rossellini's Anno uno (in which he played Alcide De Gasperi).

Death 
His last work was the 1978 TV-series L'assurdo vizio (The absurd vice), in which he portrayed the suicidal writer Cesare Pavese. He committed suicide soon after.

Filmography

References

External links 
 

Italian male film actors
1930 births
People from Caltanissetta
1978 suicides
Italian male stage actors
Italian male television actors
Accademia Nazionale di Arte Drammatica Silvio D'Amico alumni
Suicides in Italy
20th-century Italian male actors
Actors from Sicily
1978 deaths